Sheep is an album by Massachusetts folk musician Zoë Lewis, released in 1998.

Track listing
Slow Boat to China  3:01
Auntie Gladys       3:31
Sometimes           3:32
Sheep Talk           :49
Sheep               3:17   
Harvey              5:17
Here I am Again     2:54
That Thing          3:29
Yellow Room         3:29
Tea Talk            1:11
Cuppa Tea           2:41
Through the Window  3:23
Pies for the Public 4:55
Little Tune         1:31

1998 albums